Latin American studies (LAS) is an academic and research field associated with the study of Latin America. The interdisciplinary study is a subfield of area studies, and can be composed of numerous disciplines such as economics, sociology, history, international relations, political science, geography, gender studies, and literature.

Definition
Latin American studies critically examines the history, culture, international relations, and politics, of Latin America. It is not to be confused with Latino Studies, an academic discipline which studies the experience of people of Latin American ancestry in the United States. The emergence of a Latin American scholarly focus departed to a degree from Spain-centric views of regions that had been part of the Spanish Empire. As Jeffrey Herlihy-Mera describes in Decolonizing American Spanish, the rise of Latin American Studies decentralized the Eurocentric nature of scholarship across several fields: "At once a radical and democratizing thrust, the move localized a hemispheric shift in intellectual focus and had profound influences on the central tenets of the disciplines, on the institutions involved (departments, universities, publications, professional associations, and so on), on the structural presumptions that organize knowledge-production, and on the latitude of subjectivities that may be conceptualized and institutionalized. While many of the pre–Latin American studies methodologies remain (including the centrality of literature, foregrounding the national/transnational as a meaningful container of culture, and periodization exigencies), the move toward Latin America localized the themes and subjects that appeared in US classrooms, deconstructing some of the Eurocentric supremacy of the traditional model." 

Latin Americanists consider a variety of perspectives and employ diverse research tools in their work. The interdisciplinary disciplines of study varies, depending on the school, association, and academic program. For example, the Latin American Centre of the School of Interdisciplinary Area Studies (SIAS) at the University of Oxford heavily focuses on the social sciences, such as the economics, politics, and development of the region.  The Center for Latin American Studies at the University of Arizona also focuses on social sciences with faculty from Anthropology, Geography,  Political Science, Sociology, and History an places emphasis on issues related to anti-racism, human rights, security, environment and health.  On the other hand, schools like Teresa Lozano Long Institute of Latin American Studies (LLILAS) at The University of Texas at Austin, focus on the humanities; with the language, culture, and history of Latin America as a central component. Others include the study of environment and ecology of the region.

Latin American studies is usually quite open and often includes or is closely associated with, for instance, Development studies, Geography, Anthropology, Caribbean studies, and Transatlantic studies.

History
Latin America has been studied in one way or another ever since Columbus's voyage of 1492.  In the eighteenth and nineteenth centuries, scientist explorers such as Alexander von Humboldt published extensively about the region.  Towards the end of the nineteenth century and at the turn of the twentieth, within the region itself writers such as José Martí and José Enrique Rodó encouraged a consciousness of regional identity.

In 1875, the International Congress of Americanists held its first meeting in Nancy, France, and has met regularly ever since, alternating between venues in Europe and in the Western hemisphere. However, unlike the scholarly organizations of the twentieth century, the ICA does not have an ongoing organization, nor is there a journal of the ICA. The creation of formal and ongoing scholarly organizations focusing on Latin America is a product of the twentieth century.

In the US, historians with an interest in Latin American history within the American Historical Association created a group focusing on Latin America. In 1918, they founded The Hispanic American Historical Review, which has published quarterly since that time and has built a reputation as one of the premier scholarly journals.  The Latin Americanists within the AHA created the Conference on Latin American History in 1926, which is now separately incorporated (since 1964), but continues to coordinate its annual meetings with the American Historical Association.  In 1936, US Latin Americanists also founded the Handbook of Latin American Studies, with editorial offices in the Hispanic Division of the Library of Congress. In a pre-digital era, the compilation of annotated bibliographic references in the humanities and social science organized by subject and country was a vital tool for scholars in the field. In 1954 was founded in Paris the Institute of Latin American Studies (IHEAL), by the geographer Pierre Monbeig.

With the Cuban Revolution of 1959, the US government began seriously focusing on Latin America as Cuba and the hemisphere was seen to be an integral element of Cold War politics.  The Latin American historian who wrote the early history of the founding of the Latin American Studies Association wryly suggested in 1966 that at some future date Latin Americanists should erect a statue to Fidel Castro, the "remote godfather" of the field, who instigated a renewed US interest in the region.

Interest in Latin American studies increased starting in the 1950s. In the US, Latin American studies (like other area studies) was boosted by the passing of Title VI of the National Defense Education Act (NDEA) of 1958, which provided resources for Centers of Area and International Studies.  In the UK, the 1965 "Parry Report" provided similar impetus for the establishment of Institutes and Centres of Latin American Studies at Oxford, London, Cambridge, and Liverpool.  In Canada, York University in Toronto established the first Latin American center, "in part thanks to the inflow of exiled intellectuals from South America." Germany's Ibero-Amerikanisches Institut in Berlin had been founded in 1930, but not until the 1970s did it experience expansion.

Associations

 Brazilian Studies Association
 Conference on Latin American History (CLAH)
 Canadian Association for Latin American and Caribbean Studies (founded 1969)
 Consortium of Latin American Studies Programs (CLASP) 
 Latin American Studies Association (US, founded 1966)
 Mid-Atlantic Council of Latin American Studies (US, founded 1979)
 Pacific Coast Council of Latin American Studies (PCCLAS) (US)
 Rocky Mountain Council for Latin American Studies (RMCLAS) (US, founded 1954)
 Seminar on the Acquisition of Latin American Library Materials (SALALM), established 1967
 Society for Irish Latin American Studies (Ireland, founded 2003)
 Society for Latin American Studies (UK), established 1964
 Southeast Council of Latin American Studies (US, founded 1953)

Bibliographic resources
 Handbook of Latin American Studies, established 1936
 Hispanic American Periodicals Index (HAPI)
 Latin American, Caribbean, U.S. Latinx, and Iberian Online Free E-Resources (LACLI).

Reference works
Encyclopedia of Latin American History and Culture

Journals

The Americas, established 1944
 Bulletin of Latin American Research, established 1981
 Canadian Journal of Latin American and Caribbean Studies, established 1976
 Colonial Latin American Historical Review, established 1992
 Colonial Latin American Review, established 1992
 European Review of Latin American & Caribbean Studies
 The Hispanic American Historical Review, established 1918, published by Conference on Latin American History
 Historia Mexicana, established 1951
 Journal of Interamerican Studies and World Affairs
 Journal of Latin American Cultural Studies, established 1996
 Journal of Latin American Studies established 1969
 Journal of Politics in Latin America
 Latin American Perspectives, established in 1974
 Latin American Politics and Society, established 1959
 Latin American Research Review (published by the Latin American Studies Association)
 The Latin Americanist," published by Wiley-Blackwell and the Southeast Council of Latin American Studies
 Mexican Studies/Estudios Mexicanos, established 1985
 NACLA Report on the Americas Ñawpa Pacha, Journal of Andean Archaeology, established 1963
 Problems of Latin America
 Revista Mexicana de Ciencias Políticas y Sociales/Mexican Journal of Political and Social Sciences, established in 1955

Programs

 Center for Latin American Studies (CLAS) at Stanford University
 Georgetown University School of Foreign Service, Center for Latin American Studies
 The University of Texas at Austin - Teresa Lozano Long Institute of Latin American Studies (LLILAS), Austin, Texas
 Center for Latin American and Caribbean Studies (CLACS), New York University
 The Institute of Latin American Studies (ILAS), Columbia University
 Centre of Latin American Studies, University of Cambridge
 Centre of Latin American Studies, University of Oxford
 David Rockefeller Center for Latin American Studies (DRCLAS) at Harvard University
 Latin American and Caribbean Studies, The Henry M. Jackson School of International Studies, University of Washington
 Center for Latin American and Caribbean Studies (CLACS) at Indiana University 
 Center for Latin American Studies at the University of Pittsburgh
 Center for Latin American Studies at the University of Arizona
 The Center for Latin American and Caribbean Studies, University of Michigan
 Centro de Estudios Latinoamericanos, Mexico
 Latin America, Caribbean and US Latino Studies University at Albany - State University of New York, Albany, New York
 Institute of Latin American Studies (IHEAL), University of Sorbonne Nouvelle Paris 3.
 Ibero-American Institute, Berlin
 Institute of Latin American Studies, London
 University of Florida Center for Latin American Studies
 Latin American Institute, University of California, Los Angeles
 Center for Latin American Studies, University of Chicago
 University of California, Santa Barbara Latin American and Iberian Studies program
 University of New Mexico, Latin American & Iberian Institute
 Latin American Studies Division, CCUS&LAS, School of International Studies, Jawaharlal Nehru University, New Delhi, India 
 Centre for Latin American Studies, Faculty of Social Sciences, Goa University, Panaji, Goa, India.
 Roger Thayer Stone Center for Latin American Studies at Tulane University

Research Libraries and Archives outside Latin America

Bancroft Library, University of California, Berkeley
Benson Latin American Collection, University of Texas Library, Austin, Texas
Bibliotheque Nationale de France, Paris
John Carter Brown Library, Providence, Rhode Island
 Center for Research Libraries
Dumbarton Oaks, Washington, D.C.
Hispanic Society of America, New York City
Huntington Library, San Marino, California
Library of Congress, Washington, D.C.
Newberry Library, Chicago
Oliveira Lima Library, Catholic University, Washington, D.C.
Tulane University Library, New Orleans, Louisiana
University of Florida Library, Gainesville, Florida
Santa Barbara Mission Archive-Library, Santa Barbara CA
 British libraries.

Some notable Latin Americanists
See also :Category:Latin Americanists

 Jeremy Adelman, historian
 Ida Altman, historian
 Nettie Lee Benson, historian
 Carmen Bernand, historian and anthropologist
 Leslie Bethell, historian
 John Beverley
 Elizabeth Hill Boone, anthropologist
 Woodrow Borah, historian
 David Brading, historian
 Victor Bulmer-Thomas, historian
 Louise Burkhart, anthropologist
 Robert N. Burr, historian
 David Bushnell, historian
 David Carrasco, anthropologist
 Howard F. Cline, historian
 John Coatsworth, historian
 Antonio Cornejo Polar
 Daniel Cosío Villegas, historian
 Nigel Davies, historian and anthropologist
 Andrzej Dembicz, geographer
 Ariel Dorfman
 James Dunkerley
 Arturo Escobar
 Nancy Farriss, historian
 Ada Ferrer, historian
 Lillian Estelle Fisher, historian
 Albert Fishlow, economist
 John Foran, sociologist
 Jean Franco
 Néstor García Canclini
 Manuel Antonio Garretón
 Peter Gerhard, historical geographer
 Charles Gibson, historian
 Federico Gil
 Adolfo Gilly, historian
 Roberto González Echevarría
 Paul Gootenberg, historian
 Richard Graham, historian
 Greg Grandin,historian
 Andre Gunder Frank
 Tulio Halperín Donghi, historian
 Lewis Hanke, historian
 Clarence Haring, historian
 Doris Heyden, Mesoamericanist
 Albert O. Hirschman, economist
 Robin Humphreys, historian
 Daniel James, historian
 Friedrich Katz, historian
 Herbert S. Klein, historian, Stanford University
 Alan Knight, historian
 Enrique Krauze, historian
 George Kubler, historian
 Jacques Lafaye,  historian
 Kris Lane, historian
 Neil Larsen
 Asunción Lavrin, historian
 Miguel León-Portilla, historian
 Irving A. Leonard, historian
 Oscar Lewis, anthropologist
 Edwin Lieuwen, historian
 James Lockhart, historian
 Claudio Lomnitz, anthropologist
 John Lynch,  historian
 Murdo J. MacLeod, historian
 Alan McPherson, historian
 Florencia Mallon, historian
 Sylvia Molloy
 Alberto Moreiras
 Richard McGee Morse, historian
 June Nash, anthropologist
 Zelia Nuttall, anthropologist
 Guillermo O'Donnell
 J.H. Parry, historian
 Gustavo Pérez Firmat
 James Petras
 Stafford Poole, historian
 Philip Wayne Powell, historian
 Mary Louise Pratt, historian
 Ángel Rama,writer, literary critic
 Robert Redfield, anthropologist
 Andrés Reséndez, historian
 Darcy Ribeiro, Brazilian anthropologist
 Nelly Richard, cultural theorist
 Antonius Robben, anthropologist
 David Rock, historian
 Riordan Roett, political scientist
 John Howland Rowe, anthropologist
 Beatriz Sarlo, literary and cultural critic
 Carl O. Sauer, historical geographer
 Linda Schele, anthropologist
 France Vinton Scholes, historian
 Stuart B. Schwartz historian
 Rebecca J. Scott, historian
 Patricia Seed, historian
 Donald Shaw, writer, literary critic
 Kalman H. Silvert first president of the Latin American Studies Association
 Thomas Skidmore, political scientist
 Peter H. Smith, historian and political scientist 
 Alfred Stepan, political scientist
 William B. Taylor, historian
 Michael Taussig, anthropologist
 J. Eric S. Thompson, anthropologist
 Alain Touraine
 Ann Twinam, historian
 Victor L. Urquidi
 Arturo Valenzuela, political scientist
 Eric Van Young, historian
 Evon Vogt, anthropologist
 Charles Wagley, historian
 Robert Wauchope, archaeologist
 David J. Weber, historian
 Barbara Weinstein, historian
 Henry Wells, political scientist
 Nathan Whetten, sociologist
 Eric Wolf, anthropologist
 John Womack, historian
 Peter Winn
 Leopoldo Zea, philosopher (Mexican)

See also

 Latino/a studies
 Chicano Studies
 Caribbeanist
 Conference on Latin American History
 Historiography#Latin America
 History of Latin America
 Criticism of the term Latino
 Latinobarómetro

References

Further reading

Alvarez, Sonia, Arturo Arias, and Charles R. Hale. "Re-Visioning Latin American Studies." Cultural Anthropology 26, no. 2 (2011): 225-46.
 Berger,Mark R. Under Northern Eyes: Latin American Studies and U.S. Hegemony in the Americas, 1898-1990. Bloomington: Indiana University Press 1995.
 Bulmer-Thomas, Victor, ed. Thirty Years of Latin American Studies in the United Kingdom 1965-1995.  London: Institute of Latin American Studies, 1997.
 Cline, Howard F. ed. Latin American History: Essays on its Study and Teaching, 1898-1965. 2 vols. Published for the Conference on Latin American History by University of Texas Press 1967.
 Cline, Howard F. "The Latin American Studies Association: A Summary Survey with Appendix," Latin American Research Review, Vol 2 No. 1, (Autumn, 1966) pp. 57-79.
 Crahan, Margaret E. "Lest We Forget: Women's Contribution to Making LASA an Organization for All Its Members by One of the First Women to Serve on the Executive Council, (1973-1975)," LASA Forum 37 (Spring 2006): 11-14.
 Delpar, Helen. Looking South: The Evolution of Latin Americanist Scholarship in the United States, 1850-1975 (Tuscaloosa: University of Alabama Press 2008) online review
 Dent, David W., ed. Handbook of Political Science Research on Latin America: Trends from the 1960s to the 1990s. Westport CT: Greenwood Press 1990.
 Diégues Júnior, Manuel and Bryce Wood, eds. Social Science in Latin America. New York: Columbia University Press 1967.
 Eakin, Marshall C. "Latin American History in the United States: From Gentleman Scholars to Academic Specialists," History Teacher 31 (August 1998) 539-61.
 Hanke, Lewis, "The Development of Latin American Studies in the United States, 1939-1945," The Americas 4 (1947) 32-64.
 Hilbink, Lisa and Paul Drake, “The Joint Committee on Latin American Studies,” pp. 17-36, en Paul Drake et al., International Scholarly Collaboration: Lessons From the Past. A Report of the Social Science Research Council Inter-regional Working Group on International Scholarly Collaboration. Nueva York, NY: SSRC Working Paper Series on Building Intellectual Capacity for the 21st Century, 2000.
 Kagan, Richard L., ed. Spain in America: The Origins of Hispanism in the United States. Urbana: University of Illinois Press 2002.
 Mitchell, Christopher,ed. Changing Perspectives in Latin American Studies: Insights from Six Disciplines. Stanford: Stanford University Press 1988.
 Sable, Martin, ed. Guide to the Writings of Pioneer Latinamericanists in the United States. New York: Haworth Press 1989.
 Salvatore, Ricardo D. Disciplinary Conquest: U.S. Scholars in South America, 1900–1945. Durham: Duke University Press, 2016.
 Tenorio-Trillo, Mauricio. Latin America: The Allure and Power of an Idea''. Chicago: University of Chicago Press 2017.

External links
 Latin American, Caribbean, U.S. Latinx, and Iberian Online Free E-Resources (LACLI). 
 Latin American and Iberian Institute at the University of New Mexico
 Handbook of Latin American Studies
 Latin American Studies at the University of Texas's Latin American Network Information Center
 Latino Studies Resources
 Mid-Atlantic Council of Latin American Studies
 The Conference on Latin American History

Library Guides for Latin American Studies
 
 
 
 
 
 
 
 
 
 

 
Area studies